Imp Peak is in the Madison Range in the U.S. state of Montana. The summit is located in Lee Metcalf Wilderness within Gallatin and Beaverhead-Deerlodge National Forests.

References

Mountains of Madison County, Montana
Mountains of Montana